The 2022 Cork Premier Senior Football Championship was the third staging of the Cork Premier Senior Football Championship and the 134th staging overall of a championship for the top-ranking Gaelic football teams in Cork. The championship ran from 9 June to 30 October 2022.

St. Finbarr's entered the championship as the defending champions. Newcestown's relegation after a playoff defeat by Éire Óg ended 11 years of top tier football for the club.  

The final was played on 30 October 2022 at Páirc Uí Chaoimh in Cork, between Nemo Rangers and St. Finbarr's, in what was their third ever meeting in the final overall and a first meeting in five years. Nemo Rangers won the match by 1-16 to 2-09 to claim their 23rd championship title overall and a first title in two years. 

Luke Connolly and Brian Hurley were the championship's joint-top scorers.

Team changes

To Championship

Promoted from the Cork Senior A Football Championship
 Mallow

From Championship

Relegated to the Cork Senior A Football Championship
 Ilen Rovers

Participating teams

Clubs

The seedings were based on final group stage positions from the 2021 championship.

Divisions and colleges

Group A

Group A table

Group A results

Group B

Group B table

Group B results

Group C

Group C table

Group C results

Divisional/colleges section

Preliminary stage

Semi-finals 

 Duhallow, MTU Cork and University College Cork received byes to this stage.

Final

Knockout stage

Bracket

Relegation playoff

Quarter-finals

Semi-finals

Final

Championship statistics

Top scorers

Overall

In a single game

References

External link

 Cork GAA website

Cork Premier Senior Football Championship
Cork Premier Senior Football Championship
Cork Senior Football Championship
Cork Premier Senior Football Championship